Heart, Mind and Soul is the fourth album by American recording artist El DeBarge. It was released in 1994 on Reprise Records, and was produced by El DeBarge, Babyface, and Jermaine Dupri.

The album contains the hit singles "Can't Get Enough," which peaked at #21 on the Billboard Hot R&B Singles chart, and "Where Is My Love," which peaked at #19.

Critical reception
The Washington Post wrote that "the unwavering intensity of DeBarge's voice, even in the highest octaves, gives his claims of tender devotion a rare credibility." Vibe praised DeBarge's collaborations with Babyface, writing that "while Heart, Mind and Soul might not find a star fully reborn, most of its better tracks point to the inception of a promising partnership."

Track listing
"Where You Are" (Babyface, El DeBarge) – 4:02
"Can't Get Enough" (Babyface, Jonathan Robinson) – 4:08
"Where Is My Love"  (Babyface, El DeBarge) – 5:38
"You Got The Love I Want" (Babyface, El DeBarge) – 4:44
"Its Got To Be Real" (Bruce Fisher, El DeBarge) – 3:58
"Slide" (El DeBarge, Winston Riley, Jermaine Dupri, Manuel Seal) – 5:43
"I'll Be There" (Babyface, El DeBarge) – 4:02
"Special Lady" (El DeBarge, Tony Dofat) – 4:08
"Starlight, Moonlight, Candlelight" (El DeBarge, Randy DeBarge, Janet Cole) – 3:46
"You Are My Dream" (El DeBarge, Bruce Fisher) – 5:15
"Heart, Mind and Soul" (El DeBarge) – 4:36

Personnel 
 El DeBarge – lead vocals, backing vocals, keyboards (5, 9–11), bass (5, 9-11), drum programming (5), percussion (9, 11), drums (10, 11)
 Babyface – keyboards (1-4, 7), synthesizers (1-4, 7), drum programming (1-4, 7), backing vocals (1-4, 7), lead vocals (3)
 Jonathan Robinson – keyboards (2), synthesizers (2), drum programming (2)
 Tony Dofat – additional keyboards (5), keyboards (8), drum programming (8)
 W. Michael Lewis – synthesizer programming (5, 9–11), computer programming (5, 9–11), drums (9)
 Winston Phillips – keyboard bass (5)
 Jermaine Dupri – instruments (6), additional backing vocals (6)
 Manuel Seal – instruments (6), additional backing vocals (6)
 Jeff Lorber – keyboard overdubs (10)
 Tommy Organ – guitar (6)
 Ricardo Silveria – guitar (7)
 Nunzio Singore – guitar (8)
 Melvin Watson – guitar (11)
 Nathan East – bass (3, 7)
 Stevie Wonder – harmonica (1)
 Jerry Hey – trumpet solo (11)
 Paul Riser – strings (11)
 Randy DeBarge – backing vocals (2, 5, 8–10), drums (9)
 James DeBarge – backing vocals (5, 10)
 Dionne Farris – backing vocals (5), additional backing vocals (6)
 Bunny DeBarge – backing vocals (8, 9)
 Leon Ware – backing vocals (11)

Production 
 Babyface – producer (1-4, 7)
 Jonathan Robinson – producer (2)
 El DeBarge – producer (5, 9–11), executive producer, mixing (9–11)
 Jermaine Dupri – producer (6)
 Manuel Seal – producer (6)
 Tony Dofat – producer (8), mixing (8)
 Benny Medina – executive producer
 Leonard Richardson – executive producer 
 Ivy Skoff – production coordinator (1-4, 7)
 Brad Gilderman – recording (1-4, 7)
 Barney Perkins – recording (1-4, 7)
 Galen Senogles – recording (5, 9–11), mixing (9–11)
 Phil Tan – engineer (6), mixing (6)
 Dave Way – mixing (1, 2, 4, 7)
 Jon Gass – mixing (3)
 Tony Maserati – mixing (5, 8), engineer (8)
 David Betancourt – assistant engineer (1-4, 7)
 Brian Soucy – assistant engineer (1-4, 7)
 Will Williams – assistant engineer (1-4, 7)
 Gabriel Sutter – assistant engineer (3)
 W. Michael Lewis – second engineer (5, 9–11), mixing (9–11)
 Mike Alvord – second engineer (6)
 Brian Frye – second engineer (6)
 Thom Russo – mix assistant (1, 2, 4, 7)
 Vaughan Merrick – mix assistant (5)
 Hal Belknap – mix assistant (8)
 Steve Hall – mastering

Studios
 Recorded at Larrabee Sound Studios and Studio 89 (North Hollywood, CA); Sunset Sound (Hollywood, CA); Encore Studios (Burbank, CA); Krosswire Studio (Atlanta, GA); Electric Lady Studios and Easthill Recording Studios (New York, NY).
 Mixed at Larrabee Sound Studios and Studio 89; The Enterprise (Burbank, CA); Bosstown Recording Studios (Atlanta, GA); Axis Studios (New York, NY).
 Mastered at Future Disc (North Hollywood, CA).

Charts

References

El DeBarge albums
1994 albums
Albums produced by Jermaine Dupri
Albums produced by Babyface (musician)
Reprise Records albums